TV Venezuela (also known as TVV) is a Venezuelan-American television channel airing in the United States for the Venezuelan diaspora, featuring programming from various Venezuelan television networks.

History
Nathaly Salas Guaithero was named its general director, who was in charge of the channel's current affairs programming.

References

Television networks in Venezuela
Television channels and stations established in 2006
Spanish-language television stations
Media of the Crisis in Venezuela